Bewani/Wutung Onei Rural LLG is a local-level government (LLG) of Sandaun Province, Papua New Guinea. Bewani languages and Skou languages are spoken in the LLG.

Wards
01. Wutung (Wutung language speakers)
02. Musu (Wutung language speakers: Musu dialect)
03. Yaukono (Wutung language speakers: Nyao dialect)
04. Yako
05. Waromo (Dumo speakers) 
06. Lido
07. Ningra (Ningera language speakers)
08. Rawo
09. Poko
10. Nowake
11. Laitre (Rawo language speakers)
12. Puari
13. Onei (Womo language speakers)
14. Osol
15. Krisa (I'saka language speakers)
16. Ossima (Kilmeri language speakers)
17. Kilipau
18. Ilup
19. Amoi
20. Somboi
21. Ituly
22. Skotiaho
23. Ainbai (Ainbai language speakers)
24. Sumumini
25. Imbio 2
26. Imbrinis
27. Imbrinis

References

Local-level governments of Sandaun Province